Felix Adler (August 13, 1851 – April 24, 1933) was a German American professor of political and social ethics, rationalist, influential lecturer on  euthanasia, religious leader and social reformer who founded the Ethical Culture movement.

Early life 
Felix Adler was born in Alzey, Rhenish Hesse, Grand Duchy of Hesse, Germany, the son of a rabbi, Samuel Adler, a leading figure in European Reform Judaism, and Henrietta Frankfurter. The family immigrated to the United States from Germany when Felix was six years old so that his father could accept the appointment as head rabbi at Temple Emanu-El in New York.

Adler attended Columbia Grammar & Preparatory School and graduated from Columbia University in 1870 with honors. He continued at Heidelberg University where he studied as part of his training to become a rabbi. He received a PhD from Heidelberg in 1873. While in Germany, he was strongly influenced by neo-Kantianism, especially the notions that one cannot prove or disprove the existence of a deity or immortality, and that morality can be established independently of theology.

Academic career 
When Adler returned to New York at the age of twenty-three, he was asked to give a sermon at Temple Emanu-El, where he was meant to follow in his father's footsteps as rabbi of the congregation. His sermon, "The Judaism of the Future", shocked the congregation, as he did not once mention God.  Adler introduced his concept of Judaism as a universal religion of morality for all of humankind.  The sermon was his first and last at Temple Emanu-El.

In 1874, after it had become clear that he would not become a rabbi, members of his father's congregation helped Adler gain a teaching position at Cornell University as a nonresident Professor of Hebrew and Oriental literature. He was popular with his students, with whom he discussed his novel religious ideas while illuminating contemporary labor struggles and power politics. He was attacked as an atheist for his views, and in 1876 Cornell declined to accept the grant that had paid Adler's salary. In 1902 Adler was given the chair of political and social ethics at Columbia University, where he taught until his death in 1933.

New York Society of Ethical Culture 
In 1876, Adler at age 26 was invited to give a lecture expanding upon his themes first presented in the sermon at Temple Emanu-El. On May 15, 1876 he reiterated the need for a religion, without the trappings of ritual or creed, that united all of humankind in moral social action. To do away with theology and to unite theists, atheists, agnostics and deists, all in the same religious cause, was a revolutionary idea at the time.  A few weeks after the sermon, Adler started a series of weekly Sunday lectures. In February 1877, aided by  Joseph Seligman, president of Temple Emanu-El, Adler incorporated the Society of Ethical Culture.

Adler talked about "deed, not creed"; his belief was that good works were the basis of ethical culture. In 1877 the Society founded the District Nursing Department, which organized a team of nurses who visited the homebound sick in poor districts.  A year later, in 1878, the Society established a Free Kindergarten for working people's children.  Because it served the working poor, the kindergarten provided basic necessities for the children when needed, such as clothing and hot meals. It evolved over time into the Ethical Culture Fieldston School.

Well known as a lecturer and writer, Adler served as rector for the Ethical Culture School until his death in 1933. Throughout his life, he always looked beyond the immediate concerns of family, labor, and race to the long-term challenge of reconstructing institutions, such as schools and government, to promote greater justice in human relations. Cooperation rather than competition was the higher social value. He gave a series of six lectures on "The Ethics of Marriage" for the Lowell Institute's 1896–97 season.

Adler was the founding chairman of the National Child Labor Committee in 1904.  Lewis Hine was hired as the committee's photographer in 1908.  In 1917 Adler served on the Civil Liberties Bureau, which later became the American Civil Liberties Bureau and then the American Civil Liberties Union (ACLU).  In 1928 he became president of the Eastern division of the American Philosophical Association.  He served on the first Executive Board of the National Urban League.

Tenement house reform 
As a member of the New York State Tenement House Commission, Adler was concerned not only with overcrowding but also by the increase in contagious disease caused by overcrowding. Though not a proponent of free public housing, Adler spoke out about tenement reform and the rents, which he considered exorbitant. Jacob Riis wrote that Adler had "clear incisive questions that went through all subterfuges to the root of things."

In 1885 Adler and others created the Tenement House Building Company in order to build "model" affordable tenements; they rented for $8–$14/month. By 1887 the company had completed six model buildings on the Lower East Side of Manhattan for the sum of $155,000. Critics favored legislation and regulations to improve tenement conditions, but the model tenement was a progressive step.

American foreign policy 
By the late 1890s, with the increase in international conflicts, Adler switched his concern from domestic issues to the question of American foreign policy. While some contemporaries viewed the 1898 Spanish–American War as an act to liberate the Cubans from Spanish rule, others perceived the U.S. victories in the Caribbean and the Philippines as the beginning of an expansionist empire. Adler at first supported the war but later expressed concern about American sovereignty over the Philippines and Puerto Rico.  He believed that an imperialistic rather than a democratic goal was guiding U.S. foreign policy. Ethical Culture affirms "the supreme worth of the person", and Adler superimposed this tenet on international relations, believing that no single group could lay claim to superior institutions and lifestyle.

Unlike many of his contemporaries during World War I, Adler did not believe that the defeat of the German Empire would make the world safe for democracy. He thought peace depended on representative democratic governments being non-imperialistic and their curbing the arms race. He opposed the Versailles Treaty and the League of Nations. As an alternative, Adler proposed a "Parliament of Parliaments", elected by the legislative bodies of the different nations and representing  different classes of people, rather than special interests, so that common and not national differences would prevail.

Philosophy 
Adler developed an original philosophy with a foundation in those of Immanuel Kant and G.W.F. Hegel that developed and transformed these roots. He considered philosophy not just a guide of life but key to improving society and the human condition appropriate to a respect for essential human dignity. Rejecting Kant's metaphysics he embraced his stress on the intrinsic worth and dignity of the person. Combining a supreme moral principle similar to Kant's with his own detailed ideas of self-realization, he emphasized free development of the individual in relation to societal concerns and fellowship. He preceded John Dewey in a concern for the "problems of men" instead of philosophical technicalities. While his ideas shared some aspects of pragmatism he was better described as "an ethical idealist with great practical reforming zeal" he promoted an idealist version of moral perfectionism. He was however realistic and not sentimental acknowledging that man has done evil knowingly and deliberately.

Adler's ethics combined an appeal to universal principles with moral particularism, which holds that the unique circumstances of a particular case must be carefully considered to determine the moral choice in that case. Adler believed that moral laws could not be applied in the same way to varied and unique individuals but that moral principles applied to all. He saw a need to balance essential general principles with consideration of the particular specific circumstances. He developed his own version of what he called Kant's "formula" which was, "Treat every [person] as a spiritual means to thine own spiritual end and conversely."

He proposed a "supreme ethical rule" which he stated as follows: "So act as to elicit the unique personality in others, and thereby in thyself", or "Act so as to elicit the best in others and thereby in thyself." He thought by doing so one would transcend both egoism and altruism. His position was that virtue is and must be its own reward or else it is not really virtue. He characterized a virtuous act as one, "in which the ends of self and of the other are respected and promoted jointly", coordinating Kantian universalistic imperative ethics with a type of perfectionism. He took ethics seriously and felt it "must run like a golden thread through the whole of a [person's] life". He felt consequentialism particularly utilitarianism was inappropriate in ethics as it attempts to apply quantitative measures to something of a qualitative nature.

Adler's social philosophy opposed commercialism. He claimed, "The root disease that afflicts the world at the present day is the supremacy of the commercial point of view." His thought prized public works and the use of reason to develop ultimate ethical standards. Adler published such works as Creed and Deed (1878), Moral Instruction of Children (1892), Life and Destiny (1905), The Religion of Duty (1906), Essentials of Spirituality (1908), An Ethical Philosophy of Life (1918), The Reconstruction of the Spiritual Ideal (1925), and Our Part in this World. He made use of ideas from Judaism, as well as the philosophies of Kant and Ralph Waldo Emerson, mixed with certain socialist ideas of his time. He believed that the concept of a personal god was unnecessary and thought that the human personality was the central force of religion.  He believed that different people's interpretations of religions were to be respected as religious in themselves. The Ethical Culture movement was open to people of diverse beliefs. Ethical Culture societies were formed in the late nineteenth century in numerous cities in the United States, for instance, Philadelphia and St. Louis.

Works

Books 

 Updated in 1915 to include a third lecture.

Book chapters

References

Citations

Sources

Further reading 
 on Adler's impact on the Reform movement.

External links 

 Home: New York Society for Ethical Culture, founded by Adler
 Home: Brooklyn Society for Ethical Culture, an ethical society established in 1906 based on the guiding principles of Felix Adler and part of the American Ethical Union.
 Ethical Humanist Society of Chicago, established 1882 and the second Ethical Society founded by Adler
 Religious Naturalist
 
 
 
 American Ethical Union, the umbrella organization for the various Ethical Societies in the United States.

1851 births
1933 deaths
American people of German-Jewish descent
American socialists
Columbia Grammar & Preparatory School alumni
Columbia College (New York) alumni
Cornell University Department of History faculty
Ethical movement
German emigrants to the United States
19th-century German Jews
Heidelberg University alumni
Jewish humanists
Jewish philosophers
New York (state) socialists
People from Alzey
People from Rhenish Hesse
Progressive Era in the United States
Rationalists
Religious naturalists